Varshaa Vallaki is the recording studio founded by Indian film composer & singer Vidyasagar at Chennai, Tamil Nadu. Many of his songs are recorded at this studio.

Profile
It was established by Vidyasagar.  It has in its credit number of audio albums mainly associated with him. Now it continues to produce songs which is composing by him.

Vidyasagar's engineers
 M. Senthil Kumar 
 Murugan

References

External links
Official website

Vidyasagar (composer)
Recording studios in India